The 2014–15 Czech Women's First League is the 22nd season of the Czech Republic's top-tier football league for women. Slavia Praha were the defending champions.

The championship was won by Slavia for the fourth time, and the second time since 2004.

Format
The eight teams will play each other twice for a total of 14 matches per team. After that the top four teams will play a championship round for another six matches per team. The bottom placed four teams play the relegation round. Points accumulated after the regular season are halved and added the points from the next round. The champion qualify for the UEFA Women's Champions League.

Regular season

Standings
The regular season ended on 19 April 2015.

Results

Final stage
Points of the regular season were halved and rounded up, goal difference was kept.

Championship group
Played by the teams placed first to fourth of the regular season. Teams play each other twice.

Relegation group
Played by the teams placed fifth to eighth of the regular season. Teams play each other twice.

Relegation play-off
Dukla Praha had won the second league promotion play-off against Zbrojovka Brno 1–1 (a) and promoted to the first division.

Personnel and kits

Note: Flags indicate national team as has been defined under FIFA eligibility rules. Players may hold more than one non-FIFA nationality.

Top goalscorers
Updated to games played on 18 June 2015.

References

2014–15 domestic women's association football leagues
2014–15 in Czech football
Czech Women's First League seasons